Barking & Dagenham College is a general further education college in East London, England. It is located at a single complex in the eastern part of the London Borough of Barking and Dagenham next to Central Park and less than a mile from the town centre of Romford.

History
Originally known as Barking College, it became Barking & Dagenham College in 2010.

In 2015 the College became a Digital & Creative Industries Career College.

In February 2018, the College was awarded a £5m share of £25.7m funding by the Mayor, Sadiq Khan to complete its Centre for Advanced Technologies.

Courses
The college provides intermediate, advanced and higher apprenticeship training in London. Specialisms include Construction, Project Management, Human Resources Management, Business and Pharmacy. The college has 12,500 students and an annual turnover of £36 million (Source: Audited Accounts 2015/2016).

In October 2017 the College and Huawei, a Chinese multinational technology corporation, launched a Huawei Authorized Information Network Academy.

Notable alumni
Idris Elba, British actor, producer, musician, and DJ. He is best known for playing DCI John Luther on the BBC One series Luther as well as the narcotrafficker Stringer Bell in the HBO series The Wire.
Adam Gemili, British Sprinter. He is the 2014 European champion at 200 metres, and 4 x 100 metres relay, and part of the Great Britain team that won gold in the 2017 World Championships in the same event
Shaun Escoffery, a British soul and R&B singer and actor. Shaun currently plays Musafa in the Lion King.
Razaaq Adoti a British actor, producer and screenwriter. Adoti was cast as Yamba in Steven Spielberg’s feature epic, Amistad alongside Anthony Hopkins, Morgan Freeman and Matthew McConaughey.
Kano, English rapper and actor from East Ham, London.
Marianne Jean-Baptiste, actress, singer-songwriter, composer and director, best known for her roles as Hortense Cumberbatch in Secrets & Lies (1996), for which she was nominated for the Academy Award for Best Supporting Actress.
Andi Osho, stand-up comedian and presenter
Ricky Norwood, actor who played Fatboy in the BBC soap opera EastEnders
Emmanuel Nwamadi, participant at The Voice UK, Series 4.
Gurbir Singh Johal, BNOC at Homerton College Cambridge. DoSed by AA Battery and Wads.

References

External links
 

Further education colleges in London
Education in the London Borough of Barking and Dagenham
Educational institutions established in 1961
1961 establishments in England